Wizja Pogoda was the first Polish TV weather channel. The channel started in 1998 und ceased in 2002.

History
The channel was co-produced by Wizja TV and The Weather Department. Weather forecasts were prepared using advanced computer technology based on data from some 6,000 meteorological stations worldwide. Forecasts were updated twice a day. The channel was liquidated in 2002 due to the merger of Vision with Cyfra+

Initially, Wizja Pogoda was dividing the air time with National Geographic Channel and later with the Travel Channel. The program was broadcast from the morning until 1 pm (or until 2 pm when time-sharing with National Geographic Channel).

The station was available on the digital platform Wizja TV.

References

External links

Defunct television channels in Poland
Television channels and stations established in 1998
Television channels and stations disestablished in 2002
1998 establishments in Poland
2002 disestablishments in Poland
Polish-language television stations
Mass media in Warsaw
Weather television networks